Johann Georg Ehrlich (13 October 1676 – 8 February 1743) was a German merchant and town councillor from Dresden.

Ehrlich was born in  near Frauenstein.  As well as his public service in Dresden, he founded the eponymous Ehrlichsches Gestift.  He died in Dresden, aged 66.

Businesspeople from Dresden
1676 births
1743 deaths